Come Dance with Us is a Canadian children's television miniseries which aired on CBC Television in 1960.

Premise
Each episode concerned a particular theme such as the spring season, with related dance performances by the Royal Winnipeg Ballet accompanied by film and musical segments. Bob McMullin (Music Break, Altogether) was the series musical director while Brian Macdonald was choreographer.

Scheduling
This half-hour series was broadcast on Wednesdays at 5:00 p.m. (Eastern time) from 18 May to 22 June 1960.

References

External links
 Come Dance With Us  
 

CBC Television original programming
1960 Canadian television series debuts
1960 Canadian television series endings